Clarence L. Babcock House is a historic building at 25537 Shore Drive in Punta Gorda, Florida. On February 25, 2009, it was added to the U.S. National Register of Historic Places.

References

National Register of Historic Places in Charlotte County, Florida
Houses in Charlotte County, Florida
Punta Gorda, Florida